Mike Davis (born February 19, 1993) is an American football running back who is a free agent. He played college football at South Carolina, and was drafted by the San Francisco 49ers in the fourth round of the 2015 NFL Draft. Davis has also played for the Seattle Seahawks, Chicago Bears, Carolina Panthers, Atlanta Falcons and Baltimore Ravens.

Early years
Davis attended Stephenson High School in Stone Mountain, Georgia, where he played football and ran track for the Jaguars athletic teams. As a senior, he rushed for 1,923 yards on 213 carries with 21 touchdowns. He was ranked as the seventh best running back recruit by Rivals.com. In track & field, Davis posted an 11.84-second 100-meter dash. Davis was originally committed to the University of Florida but changed his mind and attended the University of South Carolina.

College career
Davis attended and played college football at the University of South Carolina from 2012–2014 under head coach Steve Spurrier.

As a true freshman in 2012, Davis rushed for 275 yards on 52 carries and two touchdowns. Davis took over as the starting running back in 2013, following Marcus Lattimore's departure. He rushed for 1,183 yards with 11 touchdowns and was a second-team All-Southeastern Conference (SEC) selection. As a junior in 2014, he rushed for 982 yards and nine touchdowns.

On December 25, 2014, Davis announced that he would forgo his senior season and enter the 2015 NFL Draft.

Professional career

San Francisco 49ers

2015

On May 2, 2015, Davis was drafted by the San Francisco 49ers in the fourth round of the 2015 NFL Draft with the 126th overall pick. On September 20, 2015, Davis made his NFL debut against the Pittsburgh Steelers, backing up Carlos Hyde who had to leave the field injured. He finished his rookie season with 58 rushing yards and 38 receiving yards.

2016
On October 23, 2016, Davis had his first-career touchdown against the Tampa Bay Buccaneers. Overall, he finished the 2016 season with 50 rushing yards and a rushing touchdown to go along with 25 receiving yards.

On May 5, 2017, Davis was released by the 49ers after failing to trade him during the 2017 NFL Draft.

Seattle Seahawks

2017
On May 8, 2017, Davis was claimed off waivers by the Seattle Seahawks. He was waived on September 2, and was signed to the Seahawks' practice squad the next day. He was promoted to the active roster on November 14. He finished the 2017 season with 240 rushing yards to go along with 15 receptions for 131 receiving yards.

2018
On March 22, 2018, Davis re-signed with the Seahawks. In Week 4, against the Arizona Cardinals, Davis recorded 21 carries for 101 rushing yards and two rushing touchdowns in the 20–17 victory. Overall, he finished the 2018 season with 514 rushing yards, four rushing touchdowns, 34 receptions, 214 receiving yards, and one receiving touchdown. The Seahawks earned the #5-seed in the NFC. Against the Dallas Cowboys in the Wild Card Round, he had 32 scrimmage yards and converted a two-point conversion in the 24–22 loss.

Chicago Bears
On March 13, 2019, Davis signed a two-year, $6 million contract with the Chicago Bears.
In Davis' first game as a Bear, he rushed five times for 19 yards and caught six passes for 17 yards as the Bears lost to the Green Bay Packers by a score of 10–3. He was released on November 9. In the 2019 season, he played in 12 games and recorded 13 carries for 27 rushing yards to go along with seven receptions for 22 receiving yards.

Carolina Panthers
On November 11, 2019, the Carolina Panthers claimed Davis off waivers.

Prior to the 2020 season, Davis was listed as one of the backups on the depth chart behind All-Pro Christian McCaffrey. In Week 2, McCaffrey suffered an ankle injury and was place on injured reserve, making Davis the Panthers’ starting running back. In Week 4 against the Arizona Cardinals, Davis recorded 111 yards from scrimmage and his first rushing touchdown of the season during the 31–21 win. In Week 5 against the Atlanta Falcons, Davis recorded 149 yards from scrimmage and a receiving touchdown during the 23–16 win. In Week 14, against the Denver Broncos, he had 93 scrimmage yards and two rushing touchdowns in the 32–27 loss. In the 2020 season, Davis had 165 carries for 642 rushing yard and six rushing touchdowns to go along with 59 receptions for 373 receiving yards and two receiving touchdowns.

Atlanta Falcons

On March 25, 2021, Davis signed a two-year, $5.5 million deal with his hometown Atlanta Falcons. He entered the season as the Falcons starting running back, but lost playing time as the season went on to Cordarrelle Patterson. He finished the season second on the team in rushing with 503 yards and three touchdowns along with 259 receiving yards and one touchdown.

On May 2, 2022, Davis was released by the Falcons.

Baltimore Ravens
On May 10, 2022, Davis signed with the Baltimore Ravens. He was released on December 10, 2022.

NFL career statistics

Personal life
His brother, James Davis, was also a running back and played college football at Clemson University and in the NFL from 2009 to 2011.

References

External links

 Baltimore Ravens bio
 South Carolina Gamecocks bio

1993 births
Living people
People from Lithonia, Georgia
Players of American football from Georgia (U.S. state)
Sportspeople from DeKalb County, Georgia
African-American players of American football
American football running backs
South Carolina Gamecocks football players
Atlanta Falcons players
Baltimore Ravens players
Chicago Bears players
Carolina Panthers players
San Francisco 49ers players
Seattle Seahawks players
21st-century African-American sportspeople